Burning Bridges is the first extended play (EP) by American hip hop recording artist Ludacris. It was released through the iTunes Store on December 16, 2014. Burning Bridges features guest appearances from Rick Ross, CeeLo Green, John Legend, Jason Aldean and Miguel. With the exception of the intro, all tracks were released again on Ludacris's next album Ludaversal in 2015.

Track listing

Charts

References

2014 debut EPs
Ludacris albums
Disturbing tha Peace albums